Vincent Robert DiFiore Jr. is an American musician. He has been a member of the band Cake since 1991, in which he plays trumpet, keyboard, and sings harmony vocals.

Early life and education 
DiFiore earned a Bachelor of Arts in Psychology from University of California, Los Angeles and a Master of Arts in Psychology from California State University, Sacramento.

Career 
DiFiore is a founding member of Cake, along with John McCrea and Greg Brown, Shon Meckfessel, and Frank French. The band released their first album, Motorcade of Generosity, in 1994, and have since released five more.

Since 2019, DiFiore has been a member of the That, with whom he plays trumpet and keyboard, as well as singing accompanying vocals.

References

Living people
American rock keyboardists
American percussionists
American trumpeters
American male trumpeters
Melodica players
Musicians from Torrance, California
Cake (band) members
1965 births